Frederick William I, Duke of Schleswig-Holstein-Sonderburg-Beck (German: Friedrich Wilhelm I. Herzog von Schleswig-Holstein-Sonderburg-Beck; 2 May 1682 – 26 June 1719) was a son of Duke August and his wife, Hedwig Louise of Schaumburg-Lippe. He succeeded his father as Duke of Schleswig-Holstein-Sonderburg-Beck in 1689.

Biography 
He converted to Roman Catholicism and joined the Army of the Holy Roman Empire. He died of his wounds received six days earlier in the Battle of Francavilla in Francavilla di Sicilia, Sicily, against Spain, in the War of the Quadruple Alliance, on 20 June 1719.

Since he had no surviving male heir, he was succeeded as Duke of Schleswig-Holstein-Sonderburg-Beck by his paternal uncle Frederick Louis.

Marriage and issue 
In Munich, Bavaria, on 8 February 1708, he married Maria Antonia called Antoinette Josefa Isnardi di Castello, 8th Countess of Sanfré (Munich, Bavaria, 15 October 1692 – Vienna, Austria, 17/18 February 1762), sister of Ignazio Giambattista Isnardi di Castello, 6th Marquess of Caraglio and 7th Count of Sanfré, Marquess of Lenoncourt and Marquess of Balinville, and daughter of Francesco Antonio Massimiliano Emmanuele Isnardi di Castello (14 July 1658 – ?), 5th Marquess of Caraglio and 6th Count Consort of Sanfré, Piedmont, Savoy, later Sardinia, and wife Maria Magdalene Grundemann von Falkenberg, heiress of Sanfré and Strevi. They had two surviving daughters: 
 Luise (Brussels, 4 June 1711 - Brussels, 3 September 1712)
 a child (8 June 1712 - Rotenburg, 30 November 1713?)
 Eugen (20 January 1714 - Regensburg, 2 May 1717)
 Charlotte (4 January 1715 - April 1716)
 Maria Anna Leopoldine (Linz, Vienna, 2 August 1717 - Turin, Sardinia, 7 February 1759/1789, buried Sanfré), heiress of Sanfré, Piedmont, married in Vienna on 4 August 1735 Dom Manuel de Sousa (21 July 1703 - in a fire, in prison, in Lisbon, January 1759), Lord of the Majorats of o Calhariz, Monfalim and os Olivais, in Portugal, and had issue, which took the surname de Sousa-[e-]Holstein and later also de Sousa-[e-]Holstein-Beck and became Counts of Palmela then Marquesses of Palmela and finally Dukes of o Faial de juro e herdade, title traded by the one of Duke of Palmela de juro e herdade, Counts of o Calhariz, Marquesses of o Faial, Marquesses of Monfalim, Marquesses of Sousa-Holstein and Marquesses of Sesimbra, extinct in male line on 6 May 1934, but which female lines of representation maintain the surnames and titles of Duke of Palmela de juro e herdade, Marquess of o Faial, Count of o Calhariz, Marquess of Sousa-Holstein, Marquess of Monfalim and Marquess of Sesimbra, having also inherited by marriage the titles of Viscount of a Lançada and Count of a Póvoa and Baron of Teixeira; her second cousin William, Count of Schaumburg-Lippe, also went to Portugal, where he became a notable military commander
 Johanna Amalia/Amalie/Amabila Barbara (Lodi, Milan, 3/4 December 1718/1719 - Vienna, 30 October 1774), married in Vienna on 26 September 1740 Dom Manuel Teles da Silva (Lisbon, 16 September 1696 - Vienna, 8 March 1771), 1st Duke of Silva, 1st Count of Silva-Tarouca in 1735, second brother of the 1st Marquess of Penalva de juro e herdade and 5th Count of Tarouca de juro e herdade in Portugal married with female issue which continued the titles, and had issue, extinct in male line on 21 September 1971

After his death, his widow inherited Haus Beck, near Ulenburg, then in Minden-Ravensberg, Brandenburg, Brandenburg-Prussia, in 1719, but sold it in 1732 to the actual duke, her late husband's first cousin Frederick William II.

Ancestors

References 

1682 births
1719 deaths
17th-century German people
18th-century German people
Converts to Roman Catholicism from Lutheranism
Dukes of Schleswig-Holstein-Sonderburg-Beck
German military personnel killed in action
Military personnel from North Rhine-Westphalia